Pieter Bergh is a South African professional rugby union football coach. He is currently the head coach of the  side that participates in the Currie Cup. In 2022 he coached the first Griquas team to play in a Currie Cup final in 52 years (last 1970).

References

Living people
South African rugby union coaches
Year of birth missing (living people)